Condat is a commune in the Cantal department in south-central France.

Geography
The village lies in the southern part of the commune, on the right bank of the Rhue.

Population

See also
Communes of the Cantal department

References

Communes of Cantal